Thacher is an unincorporated community in Pickaway County, in the U.S. state of Ohio.

History
A former variant name was Thatcher. A post office called Thatcher was established in 1886, and remained in operation until 1902. Thatcher was the name of a local blacksmith.

References

Unincorporated communities in Pickaway County, Ohio
Unincorporated communities in Ohio